Mark Hamilton (born 30 October 1970) is a physician and broadcaster. He is presenter of How Long Will You Live? on RTÉ One and former presenter of The Surgery on BBC Radio 1.

Education and medical training
Hamilton graduated from medical school with an MB ChB (Bachelor of Medicine and Surgery). He then went on to specialize in several fields such as Orthopedic surgery, Geriatric medicine and Anaesthetics, and lectured Anatomy and Biomedical Sciences at the University of Manchester. In 2007, Hamilton worked in an A&E in Withington as a registrar. He is currently training as a general practitioner at Lockside Medical Centre in Stalybridge.

Media career
Hamilton joined Radio 1 in 1999, jointly hosting the Surgery with Sara Cox. Since then Hamilton has co-presented with Emma B, Letitia, Annie Mac and Kelly Osbourne. He appeared on a Channel 4 series helping teenagers relieve stress entitled Chill Out.

References

 How Long Will You Live? at RTÉ Television

1970 births
Living people
British radio personalities
General practitioners from Northern Ireland
People educated at Bangor Grammar School
RTÉ television presenters